Massachusetts House of Representatives' 7th Norfolk district in the United States is one of 160 legislative districts included in the lower house of the Massachusetts General Court. It covers part of Norfolk County. Democrat Bill Driscoll Jr. of Milton has represented the district since 2017.

Towns represented
The district includes the following localities:
 part of Milton
 part of Randolph

The current district geographic boundary overlaps with that of the Massachusetts Senate's Norfolk, Bristol and Plymouth district.

Former locale
The district previously covered Braintree, circa 1872.

Representatives
 Horace Abercrombie, circa 1858 
 William L. Walker, circa 1859 
 Bernard Dolan, circa 1888 
 Rufus A. Thayer, circa 1888 
 Walter F. Stephens, circa 1920 
 Charles F. Holman, circa 1951 
 William Dix Morton, Jr., circa 1951 
 Elizabeth N. Metayer, circa 1975 
 Walter F. Timilty, Jr.
 William J. Driscoll, Jr, 2017-current

See also
 List of Massachusetts House of Representatives elections
 Other Norfolk County districts of the Massachusetts House of Representatives: 1st, 2nd, 3rd, 4th, 5th, 6th, 8th, 9th, 10th, 11th, 12th, 13th, 14th, 15th
 List of Massachusetts General Courts
 List of former districts of the Massachusetts House of Representatives

Images
Portraits of legislators

References

External links
 Ballotpedia
  (State House district information based on U.S. Census Bureau's American Community Survey).

House
Government of Norfolk County, Massachusetts